Brent Hartinger (born 1971) is an American author, playwright, and screenwriter, best known for his novels about gay teenagers.

Early life
Hartinger was born in 1971 in Washington state and grew up in Tacoma, Washington. He earned a bachelor's degree from Gonzaga University in Spokane, Washington, and studied for a masters in psychology at Western Washington University.

Career
Hartinger is the author of fourteen novels. His first published book was the young adult novel Geography Club (HarperCollins, 2003). He subsequently published seven companion books to that novel, including The Thing I Didn’t Know I Didn’t Know (2014); Barefoot in the City of Broken Dreams (2015); The Road to Amazing (2016); and The Otto Digmore Difference (2017). These last four books were written for adults, and include the teen characters from his earlier YA novels, but now adults in their twenties.

Hartinger's other books, all for young adults, include Grand & Humble (2006); Project Sweet Life (2008); and Three Truths and a Lie (Simon & Schuster, 2016).

A feature film version of Hartinger's first novel, Geography Club, was released in November 2013, co-starring Scott Bakula. The book is now being developed as a television series.

Also a screenwriter, nine of Hartinger's screenplays have been optioned for film, and four are currently in various stages of production, including The Starfish Scream, a gay teen drama; Decked, the animated “true” story behind a deck of playing cards; and Project Sweet Life, a teen caper movie (based on his own novel) currently in production for a 2020 release.

Hartinger's writing honors include The Lambda Literary Award; a GLAAD Media Award; the Scandiuzzi Children's Book Award; and an Edgar Award nomination. Screenwriting awards include the Screenwriting in the Sun Award, a Writers Network Fellowship, and first place in the StoryPros, Fresh Voices, Acclaim, and L.A. Comedy Festival screenwriting contests.

Hartinger has taught creative writing at Vermont College of Fine Arts, and is the co-founder of the entertainment website AfterElton.com, which was sold to MTV/Viacom in 2006.

Personal life
In 1990, Hartinger co-founded one of the world's first LGBT youth support groups, in his hometown of Tacoma, Washington.

Hartinger currently has no permanent address, and instead continuously travels the world with his husband, writer Michael Jensen. Their "digital nomad" journey, which has been featured on CBS Sunday Morning and in Forbes, is documented on their website Brent and Michael Are Going Places.

Works
The Russel Middlebrook Series (a young adult series):
Geography Club (2003)
The Order of the Poison Oak (2005)
Double Feature: Attack of the Soul-Sucking Brain Zombies/Bride of the Soul-Sucking Brain Zombies (2007)
The Elephant of Surprise (2013)

Russel Middlebrook: The Futon Years (an adult series)
The Thing I Didn't Know I Didn't Know (2014) 
Barefoot in the City of Broken Dreams (2015)
The Road to Amazing (2016)

The Otto Digmore Series (an adult series)
 The Otto Digmore Difference (2017)
 The Otto Digmore Decision (2020)

Other Books:
The Last Chance Texaco (2004)
Grand & Humble (2006)
Project Sweet Life (2009)
Shadow Walkers (2011)
Three Truths and a Lie (2016)

Footnotes

External links

Homepage - Brent's Brain
Interview with AfterElton.com - Attack of the Gay Teen Zombies
TeanReads.com Profile - Brent Hartinger 
Interview with The Feast Of Fools Podcast

1971 births
Living people
21st-century American novelists
American male novelists
American children's writers
Lambda Literary Award winners
American LGBT novelists
LGBT people from Washington (state)
Gonzaga University alumni
Western Washington University alumni
Writers from Tacoma, Washington
21st-century American male writers
Novelists from Washington (state)
21st-century LGBT people